Roller sport is popular as a recreational sport in India, specially roller skating for children, and it is gaining popularity as a competitive sport. There are clubs in cities and towns, and roller skating is taught in some schools of urban areas.

Structure

Roller sports in India are governed by the Roller Skating Federation of India, which was founded by S.P.Mumick in 1955. Tulsi Agarwal has been a long time office bearer of the federation. Individual skaters are registered with a club. The clubs are registered with district associations, which are in turn affiliated with the state associations. The state associations are affiliated with the RSFI.

Disciplines

Speed skating, artistic skating, and roller hockey are the three types of roller sports that are common in India. Roller hockey is more popular in the north of India as compared to south India. The popularity of roller hockey is in part due to the popularity of field hockey, which is the country's national sport. Similarly, 'roller basketball' and 'roller cricket' is also played in parts of the country.

Important venues

The roller skating rink at The Rink Pavilion in Mussoorie is one of the largest and most historic rinks in India. India's first international-standard banked track is at the roller sports centre in Virar, Mumbai. The 50th National Speed Roller Skating Championships were held here in January 2013. Another banked track is at the D.A.V. Public School in Faridabad. A banked-track of international standards also been made at Viman Nagar , Pune , Maharashtra.

Achievements

In the 2010 Asian Games, Anup Kumar Yama won bronze in the men's single free skating long programme. Anup Kumar and Avani Bharath Panchal clinched another bronze in the pairs skating long programme. The Indian contingent also performed well, winning 30 medals at the 14th Asian Roller Sports Championship in Kaohsiung, Taiwan. An Indian schoolboy, Rohan Ajit Kokane holds the world record for Limbo skating.

Total medals won in Roller Sports in Major tournaments

See also
 :Category:Indian roller skaters

References

External links
 Roller Skating Federation of India

Roller sports
Sport in India by sport